Home is the debut studio album by the American alternative rock band Blessid Union of Souls.  It was released on March 21, 1995 on the EMI label. The album contains their biggest hit single, "I Believe", which reached #8 on the Billboard Hot 100.

Track listing
 "I Believe" — 4:27 (Eliot Sloan, Jeff Pence, Matt Senatore)
 "Let Me Be The One" — 4:38 (Sloan, Pence, Senatore)
 "All Along" — 3:54 (Sloan, Pence, Senatore, Charles P. "Charly" Roth, Andrea M. Sarmiento)
 "Oh Virginia"* — 3:59 (Sloan, Pence, Senatore)
 "Nora" — 4:07 (Sloan, Roth)
 "Would You Be There" — 4:00 (Sloan, Pence, Senatore, Sarmiento)
 "Home" — 3:29 (Sloan, Pence, Sarmiento)
 "End of the World" — 3:42 (Sloan, Pence)
 "Heaven" — 4:33 (Sloan, Pence, Senatore)
 "Forever For Tonight" — 5:08 (Sloan, Pence)
 "Lucky To Be Here" — 5:46 (Sloan, Pence, Senatore, Roth)
 "I Believe" (extended) — 4:41

 Two versions of the album were released. The difference on the album's cover is the band having simply changed the text from having the band name on the bottom, to the top, and vice versa for the album title. The main differences in these two releases, musically, are the songs "Oh Virginia," and the extended version of "I Believe." Originally, the song "Oh Virginia" featured an electric lead guitar intro, and electric rhythm guitar throughout the track, played by Curt Benton, accompanied by his harmonica playing. The re-released album contains this song in an almost completely acoustic version, with Curt Benton only playing the harmonica. The extended version of "I Believe" is absent from the original version.

Personnel

Blessid Union of Souls
Eliot Sloan: Piano, Vocal
Jeff Pence: Acoustic & Electric Guitars, Synthesizers, Vocal
Charles P. "Charly" Roth: Electric Bass, Keyboards, Drums, String Arrangements
Eddie Hedges: Drums, Percussion

Additional Personnel
Curt Benton: Guitars, Harmonica
Ted Karras: Guitars
Paul Patterson: Violin
Kevin Hupp: Drums, Percussion
Emosia, Mike Star: Vocal Backing

Production
Produced By Emosia
Recording Engineered By Jerry Lane & Ashley Sheppard
Re-mix & Additional Production on tracks 1, 3, 5, 8, 10 & 11 by David Kershenbaum (for John Galt Entertainment); remix engineered by Kevin W. Smith
Tracks 4, 6 & 9 mixed by Tony Phillips; assisted by Liz Sroka
Tracks 2 & 7 mixed by Jerry Lane
Mastered By Ted Jensen (Sterling Sound, New York City)

Liner notes
Eliot Sloan placed a note to his ex-girlfriend Lisa (who he based the song "I Believe" on) in the liner notes of the album: "Lisa, give me a call sometime just to say hello, my number is still the same."

External links
RockOnTheNet info
Website info

References

1995 debut albums
Capitol Records albums
Blessid Union of Souls albums